Adriaan van Schrieck (Bruges, 26 December 1560 - Ypres, 26 December 1621), lord of Rodorne, was a Flemish office holder and humanist, known for his historical and linguistic work. He is also known by his Latin name, Adrianus Schrieckius.

Life 
Adriaan van Schrieck was born in Bruges. After his earliest education in his native city, he attended the University of Paris to study philosophy and law. There he came into contact with famous people such as the French statesman and Chancellor of the Kingdom of Navarre, Henri de Mesmes, and François Pithou.

Upon return to his homeland, he met Gerard Horne, count of Baucigny, and Nicolas de Montmorency, count of Estaires, by whose offices he was appointed bailiff of Cassel, Estaires, La Bassée and Loker. Later he was appointed councillor to the Archdukes Albert and Isabella. Finally, between 1609 and 1619 he was chancellor of the city of Ypres, where he spent his last years until he died of a stroke in December 1621.

In his spare time he devoted himself to historical research, supported by a network of humanist scholars in the Habsburg Netherlands and the Dutch Republic that included Nicolaas Cromhout, Erycius Puteanus and Josse de Rycke (nl). Schrieck's historical works include the history of Ypres and the prehistory of Europe.

Bibliography

Ancestors

This ancestry is based on the biography by Leonardus Neytsius (wikisource), with Van Schrieck's Monita from 1615. Neytsius, who was a canon of St. Donatian's Cathedral in Bruges, had forwarded the biography on 1 May 1613 in a recommendation letter to the bishop of Ypres, Jan de Visschere.

References

Flemish historians
Flemish Renaissance humanists
1560 births
1621 deaths
Habsburg Netherlands historians
17th-century historians from the Holy Roman Empire
17th-century linguists
16th-century linguists